This is a list of wars involving the Republic of Equatorial Guinea and its predecessors.

List

References

Equatorial Guinea
Wars